The Men's 4 × 200 metre freestyle relay competition of the swimming events at the 2015 World Aquatics Championships was held on 7 August with the heats and final.

Records
Prior to the competition, the existing world and championship records were as follows.

Results

Heats
The heats were held at 10:50

Final
The final was held at 19:11.

References

Men's 4 x 200 metre freestyle relay